The Southern Cathedrals Festival (known for short as "SCF") is a 5-day music festival held in rotation among the cathedrals of Chichester, Winchester and Salisbury in England, in the penultimate week of July. The festival was restored in 1960 after initial attempts to create the annual occasion were followed by 28 years without it. The respective director of music acts as festival director when it is that cathedral's turn to host the event - currently, they are Charles Harrison (Organist & Master of the Choristers, Chichester Cathedral), Andrew Lumsden (Organist and Director of Music, Winchester Cathedral) and David Halls (Director of Music, Salisbury Cathedral).

History
In September 1904 a service was held in Chichester Cathedral to celebrate the reopening of the main organ of Chichester Cathedral following its restoration by Hele of Plymouth. This brought together the cathedral choirs of Chichester Cathedral, Winchester Cathedral and Salisbury Cathedral. In 1905, the cathedral choirs met in Salisbury, followed by Winchester in 1906. Bishop Wilberforce of Chichester died in September 1907, so the return to Chichester had to be delayed until 1908. Thereafter, the Three Choirs Festival, as it was then known, continued until 1913 when the annual meeting was suspended because of the First World War. The festival was revived in 1920 and continued to be held until 1932. At that time the annual meeting consisted of just a single day and the joint performance by the three choirs of a choral evensong.

In 1960 the festival was re-established by John Birch (Chichester), Reginald Alwyn Surplice (Winchester) and Christopher Dearnley (Salisbury), with the title changed to the Southern Cathedrals Festival, and the length increased to two days, with two joint Evensong services and the addition of a concert.

The festival is now three days long, consisting of three concerts, a choral masterclass, an organ recital, a Festival Eucharist, buffet lunches, three evensong services sung separately by each choir and a "Fringe" event. The Fringe is an entertainment which is written and performed by the hosting cathedral. It consists of solos sung by lay clerks, comedy acts by organists and vicars, and so on.

Commissioned works

1965 Bryan Kelly: Magnificat and Nunc Dimittis in C
1965 Leonard Bernstein: Chichester Psalms
1991 Patrick Gowers: Cantata
1996 Francis Jackson: I will extol Thee
1999 Francis Grier: A Prayer of St. Augustine
2004 Malcolm Archer: Benedicite
2005 Simon Lole: O Holy Ghost, O Paraclete
2008 Tarik O'Regan: Nunc Dimittis
2009 Will Todd: Psalm 146
2012 Neil Cox: The River of Life
2013 James MacMillan: The Offered Christ
2015 Howard Moody: In the hand of God
2016 Ned Bigham: Music to hear
2018 Marco Galvani: O Sacrum Convivium
2019 Frederick Stocken: Chichester Service (Evening Canticles)
2021 Joseph Twist: How shall we sing the Lord's song in a strange land?

List of organ recitalists
An organ recital is given in the evening of the first day of the festival. Recitalists since 1986 have included:

1986 John Birch, former Organist and Master of the Choristers, Chichester Cathedral
1987 James Lancelot, Master of the Choristers and Organist, Durham Cathedral
1988 Colin Walsh, Organist, Lincoln Cathedral
1989 Simon Lindley, Organist, Leeds Parish Church
1990 Martin Neary, Organist and Master of the Choristers, Westminster Abbey
1991 Nicolas Kynaston, concert organist
1992 Jeremy Suter, Master of the Music, Carlisle Cathedral
1993 Dr Marilyn Keiser, concert organist
1994 Thomas Trotter, Birmingham City Organist
1995 John Scott, Director of Music, St Paul's Cathedral
1996 Roy Massey, Organist and Director of Music, Hereford Cathedral
1997 David Briggs, Director of Music, Gloucester Cathedral
1998 James Thomas, Director of Music, St Edmundsbury Cathedral
2001 Adrian Lucas, Master of the Choristers, Worcester Cathedral
2002 Stephen Farr, Organist and Master of the Choristers, Guildford Cathedral
2003 James O’Donnell, Organist and Master of the Choristers, Westminster Abbey
2004 Martin Baker, Master of Music, Westminster Cathedral
2005 Philip Scriven, Organist and Master of the Choristers, Lichfield Cathedral
2006 David Briggs, Organist Emeritus, Gloucester Cathedral
2007 Colin Walsh, Organist Laureate, Lincoln Cathedral
2008 John Scott, Organist and Director of Music, Saint Thomas Church Fifth Avenue
2009 James Lancelot, Master of the Choristers and Organist, Durham Cathedral
2010 Thomas Trotter, Birmingham City Organist
2011 James O’Donnell, Organist and Master of the Choristers, Westminster Abbey
2012 Gillian Weir, concert organist
2013 Mark Wardell, former Assistant Organist, Chichester Cathedral
2014 Robert Quinney, Director of Music, Peterborough Cathedral
2015 Naji Hakim, former Organiste Titulaire, Église de la Sainte-Trinité, Paris
2016 David Goode, Organist, Eton College and former Sub-Organist, Christ Church, Oxford
2017 Simon Johnson, Organist and Assistant Director of Music, St Paul's Cathedral
2018 Daniel Cook, Master of the Choristers and Organist, Durham Cathedral
2019 Franz Hauk, Organist, Liebfrauenmünster, Ingolstadt

See also
List of music festivals in the United Kingdom
Choir of Chichester Cathedral
Winchester Cathedral Choir
Salisbury Cathedral Choir

References

External links
 Official Southern Cathedrals Festival website

Music festivals established in 1904
Classical music festivals in England
Chichester Cathedral
Salisbury Cathedral
Winchester Cathedral